Edmonds School District No. 15 is the public school district of Edmonds, Washington, United States. It serves the entire city as well as the cities of Lynnwood, Mountlake Terrace, Woodway, and Brier along with parts of unincorporated Snohomish County.

Schools

List of schools

High schools

Edmonds Woodway High School
Lynnwood High School
Meadowdale High School
Mountlake Terrace High School
Scriber Lake High School
Edmonds eLearning Academy (accepts middle school students; part-time or full-time)

Facilities distribution
Within the school district, each high school was given one main facility to serve all the other high schools. Mountlake Terrace holds the largest theater, with over 300 seats and an orchestra pit; and Edmonds Woodway has the official football stadium, serving as home turf for Mountlake Terrace, Edmonds, Meadowdale, and Lynnwood.  The stadium is also the only stadium to host all the football, soccer, and track meets.

Middle schools

Alderwood Middle School (Feeds into Lynnwood High or Mountlake Terrace High)
Brier Terrace Middle School (Feeds into Mountlake Terrace High or Lynnwood High)
College Place Middle School (Feeds into Edmonds-Woodway High)
Meadowdale Middle School (Feeds into Meadowdale High)

Alternative programs

Edmonds Homeschool Resource Center

K-8 schools

Madrona Nongraded School
Maplewood Cooperative School

Elementary schools

Beverly Elementary School (Feeds into Meadowdale Middle)
Brier Elementary School (Feeds into Brier Terrace Middle)
Cedar Valley Community School (Feeds into Alderwood Middle)
Cedar Way Elementary School (feeds into Brier Terrace Middle)
Chase Lake Community School (Feeds into College Place Middle)
College Place Elementary School (Feeds into College Place Middle)
Edmonds Elementary School (Feeds into College Place Middle or Meadowdale Middle)
Hazelwood Elementary School (Feeds into Alderwood Middle)
Hilltop Elementary School (Feeds into Brier Terrace Middle or Alderwood Middle)
Lynndale Elementary School (Feeds into Meadowdale Middle)
Lynnwood Elementary School (Feeds into Alderwood Middle)
Martha Lake Elementary School (Feeds into Alderwood Middle)
Meadowdale Elementary School (Feeds into Meadowdale Middle)
Mountlake Terrace Elementary School (feeds into Brier Terrace Middle)
Oak Heights Elementary School (Feeds into Alderwood Middle)
Seaview Elementary School (Feeds into Meadowdale Middle)
Sherwood Elementary School (Feeds into College Place Middle) 
Spruce Elementary School (Feeds into Meadowdale Middle)
Terrace Park School (Feeds into Brier Terrace Middle)
Westgate Elementary School (Feeds into College Place Middle)

Feeder pattern

References

External links

1963 news story about Edmonds School District's ungraded school in Time.

Edmonds, Washington
Education in Snohomish County, Washington
Lynnwood, Washington
School districts in Washington (state)